Anereuthina atriplaga is a species of moth of the family Erebidae. It is found in the Democratic Republic of the Congo.

References

Anereuthina
Moths described in 1869
Moths of Africa